= Nepami =

Nepami may refer to:

- Newar people
- Nepali people
